Ibrahim Hendal (born 1985) is a Kuwaiti writer. A writer since 2010, he published his first book of short stories in 2012, titled Borges and Me, followed by a novel in 2017, titled Coloured Cities. He has participated in various literary festivals and cultural forums in the Middle East. He was also a participant in the IPAF Nadwa in 2019.

References

21st-century Kuwaiti writers
1985 births
Living people
Place of birth missing (living people)
Date of birth missing (living people)
Kuwaiti short story writers